Elizabeth Courtney (20 February 1792 – 2 May 1859) was the illegitimate daughter of the Whig politician and future Prime Minister Charles Grey, 2nd Earl Grey, and socialite Georgiana, Duchess of Devonshire, while Georgiana was married to William Cavendish, 5th Duke of Devonshire.

The Duchess was forced by her husband to relinquish Eliza shortly after her birth, to be raised by Charles Grey's parents, Charles Grey, 1st Earl Grey, and Elizabeth Grey, Countess Grey. The Duchess came to visit Eliza in secret. Eliza named her firstborn daughter Georgiana.

The name Courtney, extinct since the death of Charles Kelland Courtney in 1761, was derived from her great-uncle, her maternal grandmother's brother, William Poyntz (d. 1809), having married Isabella (d. 1805), sister and co-heiress of the aforementioned Charles Courtney, the last of the west country family of Courtney of Trethurfe and Courtney of Tremeer.

Upbringing

Eliza Courtney was born in France, in Aix-en-Provence on 20 February 1792. She was brought to Falloden, Northumberland in northern England and adopted by her paternal grandparents. Unlike her mother's legitimate children from her marriage, Eliza was not raised as part of the Devonshire House set in London. Her mother, Georgiana, could not acknowledge her daughter and visited her in secret until her own death. Several anguish-ridden poems from mother to daughter survive; two are reproduced below:

And yet remote from public view
Flower there is of timid hue,
Beneath a sacred shade it grows,
But sweet in native fragrance blows.
From storms secure, from tempests free,
But ah! too seldom seen by me.
For scarce permitted to behold
With longing eyes each grace unfold.

My bosom struggles with its pain
And checks the wishes form'd in vain;
Yet when I perchance supremely blest,
I hold the floweret to my breast,
Enraptur'd watch its purple glow
And blessings (all I have) bestow.
The gentle fragrance soothes my care
And fervent is my humble prayer
That no dread evil may beset
My sweet but hidden violet.

Unhappy child of indiscretion,
poor slumberer on a breast forlorn
pledge of reproof of past transgression
Dear tho' unfortunate to be born

For thee a suppliant wish addressing
To Heaven thy mother fain would dare
But conscious blushes stain the blessing
And sighs suppress my broken prayer

But in spite of these my mind unshaken
In present duty turns to thee
Tho' long repented ne'er forgotten
Thy days shall lov'd and guarded be

And should th'ungenerous world upbraid thee
for mine and for thy father's ill
A nameless mother oft shall assist thee
A hand unseen protect thee still

And tho' to rank and wealth a stranger
Thy life a humble course must run
Soon shalt thou learn to fly the danger
Which I too late have learnt to shun

Meanwhile in these sequested vallies
Here may'st thou live in safe content
For innocence may smile at malice
And thou-Oh ! Thou art innocent

Georgiana was allowed to see her daughter occasionally when the Greys brought Eliza to London, and acted as a sort of unofficial godmother.

In 1808, her maternal aunt Henrietta Ponsonby, Countess of Bessborough, who didn't know she was Eliza's aunt, visited the Greys and was dismayed at what she observed:

Eliza was not informed of her true parentage until after the death of her mother in 1806.

Marriage
In 1809, Eliza's "quasi-sister" (but actual aunt) Lady Hannah Althea Grey, widow of George Edmund Byron Bettesworth, married the member of parliament and trader the Rt. Hon. Edward "Bear" Ellice (1783–1863). Five years later, on 10 December 1814 in Scarborough, North Yorkshire, Eliza married Lt. Col. Robert Charles Ellice, a younger brother of her "brother-in-law" Edward Ellice. Their father was the Scots-born Alexander Ellice (1743–1805) of Bath, London, and Montreal, a partner in the Schenectady, New York firm of Phyn, Ellice & Co.

In March 1814, Lord Broughton recorded meeting Eliza at dinner and described her as:

Robert Ellice had a distinguished military career, rising from the military rank of "ensign" to General. 

At some point he served in South America and was present at the capture of Buenos Aires.

Ellice was acting Governor-General of Malta for five-and-a-half months, from 13 May to 27 October 1851.

In the 1856 Webster's, he is listed as having a residence at 57 Park Street, Mayfair. He died 18 June 1856.

Children
Eliza Courtney and Robert Ellice had at least four children.

Robert
Eliza's son Robert was born on 1 January 1816. In March 1853, he married Eglantine Charlotte Louisa Balfour (died 18 April 1907), third daughter of Lt-General Robert Balfour of Balbirnie. Robert Ellice died on 19 December 1858.

In 1880 his son, Major Edward Charles Ellice, DSO (1917/8), J.P., M.P. (1903-6, Liberal, St. Andrews Boroughs), (1858–1934) succeeded his first cousin once removed, Edward Ellice the Younger, to the Ellice estate at Invergarry, Inverness.

In April 1889 Major Edward Charles Ellice married another first cousin once removed, Margaret Georgiana Thomas, daughter of Frederick Freeman Thomas by his wife Mabel Brand, daughter of the 1st Viscount Hampden. Like him Margaret Georgiana was a descendant of Eliza Courtney, through Eliza's second daughter Eliza. Her brother was Freeman Freeman-Thomas, Viceroy of India and was created 1st Marquess of Willingdon.

Their fifth son, Russell (1902–1989) succeeded his father, his four elder brothers having perished young: three of them in the 1914-1918 war. [One was in the Cameron Highlanders (killed in action), one was in the Grenadiers (killed in action) and the third was lost on HMS Bulwark.]

Georgiana
Eliza's first daughter, Georgiana, was born on 12 October 1817. On 4 November 1846, Georgiana Ellice married Hugh Horatio Seymour (1821–1892). Seymour was the son of Lt. Col. Hugh Henry Seymour (1790–1821), himself a grandson of the first Marquess of Hertford by his marriage to Charlotte Cholmondeley, daughter of the first Marquess of Cholmondeley.

His grandson was Sir Horace James Seymour GCMG CVO (1885–1978), a diplomat who was British Minister in Tehran from 1936 to 1939 and British Ambassador to China, 1942 to 1946. One of Sir Horace's grandsons, James Seymour (born 1956) is married to Anya Hindmarch.

Elizabeth Georgiana
Eliza had another daughter, named Elizabeth Georgiana, in 1818. This Elizabeth married Henry Bouverie William Brand (1814–1892) in 1838. After a distinguished speakership of the House of Commons, Eliza's husband was created Viscount Hampden; later still he inherited from his brother the Barony of Dacre, as 23rd in line. Descendants include the present Lord Monk Bretton; Sarah, Duchess of York and her daughters Princess Beatrice of York and Princess Eugenie; and Viscount Hampden. Elizabeth Georgiana Brand died on 8 March 1899 at Pelham House, Lewes.

Charles Henry

Eliza's second son, Charles Henry, was born in 1823 in Florence. Charles followed his father into the 24th Regiment of Foot and was sometime Quartermaster-General and then Adjutant-General to the Forces. He married Louisa Caroline Lambton, a daughter of William Henry Lambton and niece of the 1st Earl of Durham. Thom's Upper Ten Thousand for 1876 lists him as of Horningsheath, Bury St Edmunds. He was subject of Vanity Fair treatment, 20 October 1877. Lt. Gen. Sir Charles Henry Ellice, KCB died in 1888.

Death
Eliza died on 2 May 1859, at the age of 67, and was buried on 7 May at Kensal Green Cemetery, when her address was stated as Queen's Hotel, Norwood, and 2, Cadogan Place.
Eliza Courtney's descendants include Sarah, Duchess of York, and her daughters Princesses Beatrice and Eugenie of York, who are tenth and twelfth in line to the British throne, respectively.

Ancestors

References

Biography
Georgiana, Duchess of Devonshire by Amanda Foreman, HarperCollins, London, 1998. 
Privilege and Scandal: The Remarkable Life of Harriet Spencer, Sister of Georgiana by Janet Gleeson, Crown Publishers, New York, 2006. 
Brian Masters, Georgiana Duchess of Devonshire, Hamish Hamilton, 1981.
The Earl of Bessborough (editor), Georgiana, John Murray, London, 1955.
Anthony Brand, Henry and Eliza, printed privately in Haywards Heath, 1980 (197 pages, paperback). Letters between her daughter and son-in-law.
Peter Townend (ed), Burke's Peerage and Baronetage, 105th edition, London 1970 (1978, 3rd impression).
See the film The Duchess, 2008.

Other
 Phyn, Ellice and Company of Schenectady, by R. H. Fleming in Contributions to Canadian Economics, Vol. 4, 1932 (1932), pp. 7–41.
 The New Annual Army List and Militia List for 1854, the 17th annual volume, by Major Henry G. Hart, John Murray, Albemarle street, London, 1854.
 Webster's Royal Red Book; or Court and Fashionable Register, for January, 1856, Webster & Co., 60 Piccadilly, London.
 The Upper Ten Thousand, for 1876, A biographical handbook of all the titled and official classes of the Kingdom with their addresses, compiled and edited by Adam Bisset Thom, Kelly & Co., London. (First published 1875).
Burke's Genealogical and Heraldic History of the Landed Gentry, 1952, edited L. G. Pine, London, (sub. Ellice of Invergarry, page 744–745)

External links
 Poem by Benjamin Kennicott, D.D. (1718–1783) describing the near death of Kelland Courtney's wife in 1743.
 Eliza's brother-in-law, the Bear.
 Eliza's nephew-by-marriage Edward Ellice (1810–1880), son of the Bear. See Edward Ellice II.
 Edward Ellice's first wife

1792 births
1859 deaths
Daughters of British earls
Children of prime ministers of the United Kingdom
19th-century English people
Eliza
Eliza
Ellice family